The qualification process for the 2021 Rugby World Cup began on 9 August 2019 with 12 teams qualifying to the tournament which will be held in New Zealand.  The 2021 Rugby World Cup was postponed by one year in March 2021 to 2022 due to the COVID-19 pandemic.

Qualification process

Following the previous World Cup, seven teams received an automatic qualification berth - these berths being given to the top 7 teams (New Zealand, England, France, United States, Canada, Australia and Wales). The remaining five berths for the tournament will be awarded through regional tournaments.

The non-automatic qualification process began on 9 August 2019.

Regional qualification
Twelve nations are participating in the 2021 Rugby World Cup. Seven teams qualified automatically by virtue of their performance at the previous tournament, leaving five teams to qualify through regional matches.

Qualification process

Africa

Rugby Africa was granted one spot which was awarded to the winner of the Rugby Africa Women's Cup (Africa 1). The runner-up (Africa 2) progressed to a cross-regional Final Qualification play-off against the South American winner. South Africa qualified by winning all three of their matches while Kenya competed in the South America/Africa play-off.

Americas
Rugby Americas North was not granted a spot to the World Cup, but Sudamérica Rugby allowed South America 1, the winner of a match between Colombia and Brazil to compete against the runner-up of the 2019 Rugby Africa Women's Cup for a place in the Final Qualification tournament.

Colombia moved on to the South America/Africa play-off against Kenya (Africa 2), who were runners-up of the 2019 Rugby Africa Women's Cup. The match was originally planned for 18 April, but was postponed due to the COVID-19 pandemic.

Asia

Asia Rugby was granted one spot, Asia 1, to the highest ranked team in the 2021 Asia Rugby Women's Championship (ARWC). Japan and Hong Kong, the two teams from the 2017 World Cup, were joined by the winner of the 2019 playoff for promotion to the tournament. The runner-up of the tournament progressed to the Final Qualification as Asia 2.

The winner of the 2019 Asia Division I Championship progressed to the playoff for promotion to the ARWC against Kazakhstan.

As winners, China faced Kazakhstan in two matches. The team with the highest aggregate score qualified for the ARWC.

With an aggregate score of 13–23, Kazakhstan qualified for the ARWC.

Due to the COVID-19 pandemic, the tournament was postponed several times, originally from 14 to 22 March 2020 to 8–16 May 2020, then to November 2020, then to 5–13 March 2021, then to 2–12 October 2021 and then finally cancelled altogether.

Due to quarantine challenges, Japan were awarded qualification to the World Cup for being highest in the World Rankings. Hong Kong and Kazakhstan were scheduled to play a single qualification match to advance to the Final Qualification. The Asia Rugby Women's Championship did not take place; Hong Kong withdrew due to the challenges caused by the COVID-19 pandemic. Kazakhstan qualified automatically as Asia 2 for the Final Qualification Tournament.

Europe
Rugby Europe was granted one spot to the highest ranked team in a qualifying tournament (Europe 1) consisting of Six Nations sides that had not already qualified automatically from the previous World Cup, and the winner of the 2020 Rugby Europe Women's Championship. As England, France and Wales had qualified automatically, the tournament consisted of Ireland, Italy and Scotland, along with winner of the European Championship consisting of the Netherlands, Russia and Spain. The runner-up of the tournament progressed to the Final Qualification as Europe 2.

As winners of the Rugby Europe Women's Championship, Spain joined Ireland, Italy and Scotland in the European Qualification Tournament. It took place from the 13 to 25 September 2021in Parma, Italy

Round 1

Round 2

Round 3

Oceania

Oceania Rugby was granted one spot to the winner of the playoff of the highest ranked teams in the 2019 Oceania Rugby Women's Championship (Oceania 1) which was held in Fiji from 18 to 30 November; the loser of the playoff would play against the winner of another playoff between the lowest ranked teams to gain the right enter the Final Qualification tournament as Oceania 2. Six teams competed in the competition with Australia and New Zealand each sending a development team to the tournament. The six teams were separated into two groups with New Zealand A joining Samoa and Tonga in Pool A while Australia A, Fiji and Papua New Guinea went into Pool B. A split pool format was used whereby each team was scheduled to play three matches, but only against teams in the opposite pool.

Pool A

Pool B

 Tonga withdrew from the competition shortly before their first game with Australia A due to the measles outbreak in Tonga. The match was declared a 0–0 draw.

As New Zealand and Australia had already qualified for the World Cup, Samoa and Fiji met in the playoff match with the winner gaining qualification to the World Cup and the loser to play against the winner of a match between Tonga and Papua New Guinea to earn a place in the Final Qualification tournament.

As a result, Fiji qualified for the World Cup, while Samoa awaited the winner of Tonga and Papua New Guinea.

Tonga played Samoa to determine who advanced to the  tournament.

As a result, Samoa became the first team to qualify for the Final Qualification tournament.

South America/Africa play-off
A play-off between Africa 2 (the runner-up of the 2019 Rugby Africa Women's Cup) and South America 1 (the winner of the South America play-off between Colombia and Brazil) was played for a place in the Final Qualification. Kenya finished in second in the RAWC, and Colombia defeated Brazil. The match was scheduled for 18 April 2020 but was postponed to 25 August 2021 due to the COVID-19 pandemic.

As a result, Colombia qualified for the Final Qualification tournament.

Final Qualification Tournament
The final team to qualify for the 2021 Rugby World Cup was decided via a Final Qualification tournament. Four teams competed in the tournament: the second placed teams from the regional tournaments of Asia (Asia 2) and Europe (Europe 2), the winner of the play-off between the loser of the Oceania World Cup qualifying play-off and the winner of another play-off between the bottom ranked teams in the same tournament (Oceania 2), and the winner of the South America/Africa play-off. Samoa withdrew from the Final Qualification Tournament due to challenges caused by the ongoing COVID-19 pandemic. As the two bottom ranked teams, Kazakhstan and Colombia played a semi-final match on 19 February 2022. Colombia defeated Kazakhstan and played Scotland in the final on 25 February 2022. 

Scotland claimed the final spot in the 2021 Rugby World Cup by defeating Colombia 59 points to 3.

Semi-final

Final

References

External links
. RWCWomens.com

2021 Rugby World Cup
2019 in women's rugby union
2020 in women's rugby union
Rugby World Cup Qualifying, 2021
2021 in women's rugby union